Andriivka is an urban-type settlement in the Volnovakha Raion, Donetsk Oblast (province) of eastern Ukraine. Population:

References

Urban-type settlements in Volnovakha Raion